Joshua David Bell (born December 9, 1967) is an American violinist and conductor. He plays the Gibson Stradivarius.

Early life and education 
Bell was born in Bloomington, Indiana, to Shirley Bell, a therapist, and Alan P. Bell, a psychologist, professor emeritus at Indiana University (IU), and former Kinsey researcher. His father is of Scottish descent and his mother is Jewish (her father was born in Mandatory Palestine and her mother was from Minsk).

Bell began playing the violin at age four after his mother discovered that he had taken rubber bands from around the house and stretched them across the handles of his nine dresser drawers to pluck out music he had heard her play on the piano. His parents got a scaled-to-size violin for him when he was five and started giving him lessons. Bell took to the instrument but had an otherwise normal Indiana childhood, playing video games and excelling at sports, especially tennis and bowling. He placed in a national tennis tournament at age ten.

Bell's first violin teacher was Donna Bricht, widow of Indiana University music faculty member Walter Bricht. His second was Mimi Zweig, and his third the violinist and pedagog Josef Gingold, who accepted Bell as a student after his parents assured him that they were not interested in pushing their son to be a star but simply wanted him to have the best teacher for his abilities. By age 12, Bell was serious about the instrument, thanks in large part to Gingold's inspiration.

At age 14, Bell appeared as a soloist with the Philadelphia Orchestra under Riccardo Muti. He studied violin at the Indiana University Jacobs School of Music and graduated from Bloomington High School North in 1984. In 1989 Bell received an Artist Diploma in violin performance from Indiana University. IU also honored him with a Distinguished Alumni Service Award two years after his graduation. He has been named an "Indiana Living Legend" and received the Indiana Governor's Arts Award.

Career 

Bell made his Carnegie Hall debut in 1985, at age 17, with the St. Louis Symphony. In 1990, at age 22, he went on the American Russian Young Artists Orchestra's first tour of Russia. He has since performed with many of the world's major orchestras and conductors. As well as the standard concerto repertoire, he has performed new works. Nicholas Maw's violin concerto is dedicated to Bell, who premiered it in 1993 and won a Grammy Award for his recording. He performed the solo part on John Corigliano's Oscar-winning soundtrack to the film The Red Violin and was featured in Ladies in Lavender. He also appeared in the movie Music of the Heart, with other violinists.

Bell's instrument is the Gibson ex Huberman, a Stradivarius made in 1713 during what is known as Stradivari's "Golden Era". The violin was stolen twice from its previous owner, Bronisław Huberman; the last time the thief confessed to the act on his deathbed. Bell had played the violin; its owner at the time, violinist Norbert Brainin, jokingly told him that it could be his for $4 million. On August 3, 2001, Bell was in London to perform at The Proms; whilst there he was approached by J & A Beare before the concert. He learned that the violin was there and about to be sold to a German industrialist to become part of a collection. Bell played the violin at that Proms concert that same evening. He later sold his previous violin, the Tom Taylor Stradivarius, for a little more than $2 million and bought the Gibson ex Huberman for a little under the $4 million asking price. The 2013 documentary The Return of the Violin tells the story of the instrument's theft, return, and subsequent acquisition by Bell. Bell's first recording with the Gibson ex Huberman was Romance of the Violin for Sony Classical Records in 2003.

Bell served as artistic partner for the Saint Paul Chamber Orchestra from 2004 until 2007, and as a visiting professor at the Royal Academy of Music in London. He also serves on the artists' selection committee for the Kennedy Center Honors and is an adjunct associate professor at the Massachusetts Institute of Technology.

Bell won the Avery Fisher Prize on April 10, 2007, at Lincoln Center in New York City. The prize is given once every few years to classical instrumentalists for outstanding achievement. On May 3, 2007, Indiana University's Jacobs School of Music announced that Bell had joined the faculty as a senior lecturer.

In 2008, Bell received the Golden Plate Award of the American Academy of Achievement presented by Awards Council member Dr. Ben Carson.

Bell collaborated with film composer Hans Zimmer by providing violin solos for the soundtrack of the 2009 film Angels & Demons, based on Dan Brown's 2000 novel of the same name.

In May 2011, Bell was named the new Music Director of the Academy of St Martin in the Fields (ASMF). He has recorded commercially with the ASMF for the Sony Classical label. In July 2017, the ASMF announced a three-year extension of his contract, through 2020. Bell and the orchestra won the 2017 Helpmann Award for Best Individual Classical Music Performance.

In 2013, Bell accompanied Scarlett Johansson in the song "Before My Time". Written by J. Ralph for the documentary Chasing Ice, it received a nomination for the Academy Award for Best Original Song.

Bell played himself in three episodes of Mozart in the Jungle in 2014, 2015, and 2016. In 2016, he had a cameo in the penultimate musical episode of Royal Pains. He also appeared as himself in episode 8 ("Quacktice Makes Perfect") of the 2017 Netflix original series Julie's Greenroom.

Washington Post experiment 
In an experiment initiated by The Washington Post columnist Gene Weingarten, Bell donned a baseball cap and played as an incognito busker at the Metro subway station L'Enfant Plaza in Washington, D.C., on January 12, 2007. The experiment was videotaped on hidden camera; of the 1,097 people who passed by, seven stopped to listen to him, and one recognized him. For his nearly 45-minute performance, Bell collected $32.17 from 27 passersby (excluding $20 from the one who recognized him). Three days earlier, he earned considerably more playing the same repertoire at a concert. Weingarten won the 2008 Pulitzer Prize for Feature Writing for his article on the experiment. The Washington Post posted the video on YouTube and a feature-length documentary, Find Your Way: A Busker's Documentary, chronicled Bell's experience. A somewhat inaccurate retelling of the story went viral.

Personal life 
Bell has three sisters. He and his former partner, Lisa Matricardi, have three sons: Josef, born in 2007, and twins Benjamin and Samuel, born in 2010. On October 5, 2019, Bell married opera singer Larisa Martinez at their home in Mount Kisco, New York. They also live in the Gramercy Park neighborhood of Manhattan.

Selected discography

Soundtrack albums 
 Chasing Ice Original Motion Picture Soundtrack, 2012
 The Flowers of War Original Motion Picture Soundtrack, 2012: Joshua Bell, solo violin
 Angels & Demons Original Motion Picture Soundtrack, 2009
 Defiance Original Motion Picture Soundtrack, 2008
 Ladies in Lavender Original Motion Picture Soundtrack, 2005: Joshua Bell, solo violin
 Iris Original Motion Picture Soundtrack, 2001: Joshua Bell, solo violin
 The Red Violin, 1998: Joshua Bell, solo Violin

References

External links 

 
 Joshua Bell at Sony Classical
 
 
 Joshua Bell on IMG Artists, General Management
 "Bell Man", by Mandy Katz; in-depth profile in moment magazine
 Interview on The Diane Rehm Show radio program
 Recording of Bell's performance in L'Enfant Plaza
 Bach & friends Documentary
Classical Archives interview

1967 births
20th-century American Jews
20th-century American male musicians
20th-century classical violinists
21st-century American Jews
21st-century American male musicians
21st-century classical violinists
Academics of the Royal Academy of Music
American classical violinists
American male conductors (music)
American male violinists
American people of Belarusian-Jewish descent
American people of Palestinian-Jewish descent
American people of Scottish descent
Classical musicians from Indiana
Columbia Records artists
Grammy Award winners
Helpmann Award winners
Honorary Members of the Royal Academy of Music
Jacobs School of Music alumni
Jacobs School of Music faculty
Jewish American classical musicians
Jewish American philanthropists
Jewish classical violinists
Living people
Male classical violinists
Musicians from Bloomington, Indiana
Performing arts pages with videographic documentation
Articles containing video clips
Sony Classical Records artists
20th-century American violinists
21st-century American violinists